NuScale Power Corporation is a publicly traded American company that designs and markets small modular reactors (SMRs). It is headquartered in Portland, Oregon. The design was certified by the US Nuclear Regulatory Commission (NRC) in January 2023. NuScale has agreements to build reactors in Idaho, in 2029 and 2030.

Each module is intended to be kept in an underground pool and is expected to produce about 60 megawatts of electricity. Its coolant loop uses natural water-circulation, fed from a large water reservoir that can operate without powered pumps.

History
NuScale was founded based on research funded by the United States Department of Energy (DOE) and conducted by Oregon State University, the Idaho National Laboratory, and other schools beginning in 2000. Oregon State's nuclear department had been developing passive water-circulation techniques for cooling in nuclear plants. DOE founded the research from 2000 to 2003.

A group of scientists at Oregon State continued the work. They built a test lab at one-third scale and inherited related patents from the university in 2007, in exchange for an equity stake. NuScale was founded that year. Its first funding round came in January 2008. It began seeking certification with the NRC in February 2008.

By 2011, NuScale had raised $35 million and had 100 employees in Portland; Richland, Washington; and Corvallis, Oregon. NuScale was the first to submit small reactor plans to the NRC and the first to gain approval. It was evaluated by a consortium of utility companies called Energy Northwest.

Funding difficulties and rebound
In January 2011, NuScale's largest investor, Kenwood Group, was investigated by the U.S. Securities and Exchange Commission (SEC) and later pleaded guilty to operating a Ponzi scheme. The SEC investigation was not related to Kenwood's dealings with NuScale, but Kenwood's assets were frozen just as NuScale was expecting additional funding. The company started making staffing and pay cuts as executives looked for new funding sources and most of the company's employees were laid off.

That September, NuScale obtained a loan to re-hire 60 employees. In October, Fluor Corporation acquired a majority interest in the company for $3.5 million and promised almost $30 million in working capital. According to The Energy Daily, Fluor's investment saved the company, which had been "financially marooned" by its prior investor. A separate agreement gave Fluor the rights to construct NuScale-based power plants.

In August 2012, Rolls-Royce Holdings said it would support NuScale's commercialization efforts and help it obtain funding from DOE's funding opportunity announcement. In December 2012, co-founder Paul G. Lorenzini was replaced by John Hopkins as CEO. It was not funded in the first DOE's round. In the second round in December 2013, NuScale won up to $226 million in "cost-sharing" funding to share the expense of obtaining government approval, through the SMR Licensing Technical Support program. This was followed by an agreement in May 2014 for up to $217 million in funding over a five-year period, whereby DOE would match private funding.

In 2015, the company and Utah Associated Municipal Power Systems (UAMPS) started working on  the Carbon Free Power Project (CFPP). It involves a cluster of 6 reactors. At full power, the plant could scalably produce 462 MWe. DOE could provide about $140 million/year over 10 years, awaiting Congressional support. UAMPS operates power plants in Wyoming, New Mexico, California, and Utah, selling to local utilities. As of 2021, 8 cities had withdrawn from CFPP.

Deployment history 
In March 2012, NuScale signed an agreement with DOE that allowed NuScale and two partners to build and operate a NuScale-based nuclear power plant at a Savannah River site in South Carolina. The following month, Energy Northwest said it had no immediate plans to construct a nuclear power plant, but had evaluated all the available SMR technologies and identified NuScale as the best available option.

In July 2013, NuScale announced an effort to demonstrate NuScale reactors in the western United States, called Program WIN (Western Initiative for Nuclear), with plans to build the first NuScale-based power plant there by 2024. In November 2014, NuScale announced it was building what it expected to be the first US SMR in Idaho. The plant is for CFPP with UAMPS. The company submitted designs to the NRC in January 2017. In 2020, DOE approved a $1.355 billion cost-share award. In July 2021, the proposal downsized to 6 reactors, and the expected electricity price increased to $58/MWh. 

In January 2018, the NRC agreed that the passive safety features allow NuScale's SMR design to operate safely without back-up power.

In August 2020, the NRC issued a final safety evaluation report, certifying the design as having met safety requirements.

In November 2021, NuScale announced its intent to build with Nuclearelectrica its first reactors in Romania by  2028.

In February 2022, NuScale and mining conglomerate KGHM announced a contract to construct an SMR in Poland by 2029. In April, Doosan Enerbility contracted to begin manufacturing Power Module components. Doosan Enerbility expected to reach full-scale production at their plant in Changwon, South Korea, in the second half of 2023.

In May 2022, NuScale completed a merger with the special-purpose acquisition company (SPAC), Spring Valley Acquisition Corp, raising $380M.

On 28 July 2022 the NRC announced it would certify NuScale's small modular reactor.

On 28 December 2022 Romanian company RoPower Nuclear contracted for Front-End Engineering and Design. The location is expected to be Doicesti. RoPower is a joint venture between Nuclearelectrica and Nove Power & Gas.

In January 2023, CFPP approved a new Budget and Plan of Finance, establishing a target price of $89/MWh (¢8.9/kWh) after an estimated $30/MWh generation subsidy from the 2022 Inflation Reduction Act.

In January 2023, the NRC certified NuScale's design for use in the US.

Reactors

NuScale reactors take 1% of the space of a conventional reactor and generate 77 MWe. The design uses light water for cooling and power generation as in conventional nuclear plants. Water is heated by the nuclear core at the base of the reactor vessel. Heated water flows up the riser, then down over steam generators. As heat is transferred, the water cools and becomes denser, sinking to the bottom of the device, and the cycle is repeated. The heat creates steam that turns a turbine, which drives an electrical generator.

The modules are pre-fabricated, delivered by rail, barge or truck and assembled on-site. As of 2021, the units expected to produce 77  MWe (gross), or about 73.5 MWe (net), and require refueling with standard 4.95 percent low-enriched uranium-235 fuel every two years.

NuScale's design does not rely on powered water pumps or circulatory equipment. The reactor is designed to shut down and cool itself indefinitely during most accidents. The devices are intended to be installed in a below-ground pool to absorb earthquake shocks, with a concrete lid over the pool. In the event that AC power is lost for normal cooling systems, the water in the pool absorbs heat and boils. The pool stores enough water to safely cool the reactor core for an unlimited amount of time without needing manual replenishment.

New Scientist reported peer‑reviewed analysis from Stanford University that assessed nuclear waste production from SMR reactors and concluded that "SMR performed worse on nearly all of our metrics compared to standard commercial reactors". The results of the study were rejected by NuScale as based on outdated information.

Comparisons

NuScale is expected to be the first SMR to market, because it is more similar to the systems used in conventional power plants. The company estimates a twelve-unit NuScale plant would cost $4,200 (an earlier estimate was $5,000) per kilowatt. In comparison, the Energy Information Administration in 2013 estimated overnight costs to be $4,700 per kilowatt for conventional nuclear power, $4,600 for a carbon sequestration coal plant and $931 at a gas-fired plant or in excess of $1,800 for a gas-fired plant with carbon sequestration (all 2011 dollars). David Mohre, executive director of NRECA's Energy and Power Division, said SMRs like NuScale's are ideal for rural towns that need small power plants. 

NuScale power plants are expected to take less time, materials and space to construct than other power sources and can be expanded incrementally to meet growing power needs.

Potential SMR competitors include Babcock & Wilcox, GE Hitachi Nuclear Energy, Gen4 Energy, Holtec International, Intellectual Ventures, OPEN100, Westinghouse Electric Company, and X-energy.

Safety concerns 
In March 2020, a panel of independent experts from the NRC's Advisory Committee on Reactor Safeguards (ACRS) claimed to find reactor design flaws. The main issue was that in the event of an emergency shutdown condensed steam returning to the reactor vessel would be low in boron and might not absorb enough neutrons. NuScale modified its design to ensure that more boron would spread to the returning water. ACRS was concerned that operators could accidentally add deboronated water to the core. The panel found other problems: the steam generator could be prone to damaging vibrations. However, on 29 July ACRS recommended that the safety evaluation report be issued and the reactor be certified.

Operations
NuScale has offices in Portland, Oregon; Corvallis, Oregon; Charlotte, North Carolina; and Rockville, Maryland. Its headquarters are in Portland and its factory is located in Corvallis. It maintains a test facility at Oregon State University and Italy. 

The company is publicly traded as SMR on the New York Stock Exchange.

See also 

 List of small modular reactor designs
 TMSR-LF1 Thorium Molten-Salt Reactor, under construction in China
 HTR-PM High-temperature gas-cooled, commissioned for operation in China 
 BREST Uranium-Plutonium Lead-Cooled Reactor, under construction in Russia
 ARC-100 Sodium Cooled Uranium Reactor, under construction in Canada

Notes

References

External links

 
 A detailed description of NuScale devices in Power Magazine

Companies based in Portland, Oregon
Companies listed on the New York Stock Exchange
Nuclear power companies of the United States
Nuclear reactors
Special-purpose acquisition companies